Lesego D. Duduetsang Radiakanyo (born 27 June 1999) is a Motswana footballer who plays as a forward for Double Action and the Botswana women's national team.

References

1999 births
Living people
Botswana women's footballers
Women's association football forwards
Botswana women's international footballers